The Library Bureau was a business founded by Melville Dewey in 1876 to provide supplies and equipment to libraries. The Library Bureau quickly became a one-stop vendor for supplies and equipment a library might need. By 1900, its lengthy, well illustrated catalog was widely distributed.

During the late 1800s and early 1900s, the Library Bureau supplied furniture, equipment, supplies, and services to many of the new Carnegie Libraries being built. The Bureau prospered. It opened a number of large factories to provide furniture and supplies. It sold merchandise and services through a network of sales offices and distributors in the United States (46 in 1922), England (4), France (1), and Belgium.

In Boston, its headquarters operated from offices located successively at Hawley Street, Franklin Street, and Atlantic Avenue.

In the 1890s, the Library Bureau introduced vertical filing.  It soon became a large supplier of filing equipment, supplies, and expertise to business and government. Library Bureau schools in major cities taught filing to clerical workers.

It opened a large factory in 1909 in a brick building at 224 Albany Street, Cambridge, Massachusetts; by 1925, there were 450 workers here. In 1918, the adjacent building, 230 Albany Street, became its headquarters. By 1922, the Library Bureau had factories in Cambridge, Chicago, New York City, London, and Ilion, New York,.

Between 1896 and 1899 Library Bureau collaborated with Herman Hollerith's Tabulating Machine Company to distribute its punched cards processing machines.

Successors
In 1927, the Library Bureau was absorbed along with a number of suppliers of office supplies and equipment by the newly formed Remington Rand holding company. The Remington Rand continued to use the brand name "Library Bureau" into the 1950s.

After Remington Rand and its successor companies had stopped using the Library Bureau brand name, they sold the name to a furniture company in Maryland which makes furniture in the spirit of antique Library Bureau furniture. The Library Bureau Steel company claims to continue the Library Bureau shelving business.

See also
L. B. Speedac, a visible file system commercialized by the Library Bureau

Notes

References
 Library Bureau, Classified Illustrated Catalog of the Library Department of the Library Bureau, 1899 full text
 —,  The Story of Library Bureau, 1909 full text
 —, Filing as a Profession for Women, 1919 full text
 —, "Steel Card and Filing Cabinets, Library Bureau", 1921 full text, a catalog of office supplies and equipment
 "Remington Rand", an advertisement in the Los Angeles Times, 21 June 1927, p. 23, announces the opening of a Los Angeles office and display room. The Remington Rand business services are listed as Kardex Rand, Remington, Dalton, Vaxter-Vawter, Powers Accounting, Library Bureau, and Safe-Cabinet.

External links

 Additional materials can be found at the Open Library and the Digital Public Library of America

1876 establishments in Massachusetts
Companies based in Boston
Companies established in 1876
Libraries in the United States